Frank Bray Gibney (September 21, 1924 – April 9, 2006) was an American journalist, editor, writer and scholar. He learned Japanese while in the American Navy during World War II, then was stationed in Japan. As a journalist in Tokyo, he wrote Five Gentlemen of Japan, a popular book about the Japanese, welcomed for its humanism and for transcending the bitterness of war. A half dozen more books followed on Japan and East Asia. He also wrote on communism in Europe. At the Encyclopædia Britannica, he directed translations, and he was the founder of the Pacific Basin Institute.

Life and career
Born in Scranton, Pennsylvania, Gibney came of age in New York City. The son of a restaurateur, he excelled in debate, being awarded a scholarship to Yale University. His education was interrupted by World War II, yet he was awarded a bachelor's degree in classics in absentia in 1945.

In the Navy, he studied at its elite Japanese Language School located in the University of Colorado. As an officer in naval intelligence, he was then stationed at Iroquois Point near Pearl Harbor. There he interrogated Japanese prisoners of war, officers among them, making daily use of his Japanese. In 1997 he wrote that in Hawaii "I came to know the Japanese." After the war he kept in touch with prisoners "through reunions at a sushi restaurant." For the American occupation he had been transferred to Japan. "I was a small human bridge between Gen. Douglas MacArthur's conquering army and a puzzled but receptive Japanese public."

A foreign correspondent for Time, Gibney also served as Tokyo bureau chief. He was an editorial writer at Life. He became a senior features editor at Newsweek.  While his residence remained in Tokyo, covering Japan, Korea, and Southeast Asia, he also was sent on assignments to Europe. From his experience as a journalist, he began to publish a series of books, many on the Japanese. His first in 1953, Five Gentlemen of Japan, was widely acclaimed for its cross-cultural insight.

In the early 1960s, Gibney worked briefly for two magazines. Until he resigned he was editor for Show Business Illustrated. He then became the publisher of the short-lived Show magazine, which focused on art and culture. Show is remembered, among other things, for "an undercover exposé of the Playboy bunny world by Gloria Steinem."

From 1966 to 1976 he worked in translations at Encyclopædia Britannica, and served as vice chairman of its Board of Editors. He was president of a joint venture between Britannica and Tokyo Broadcasting System. In 1976 the Japanese government, "for his work in cultural affairs," awarded him the Order of the Rising Sun, Third Class. A few years later, the Japanese government again celebrated his achievements with the Order of the Sacred Treasure, Second Class.

In 1979 Frank Gibney founded the Pacific Basin Institute in Santa Barbara, California, which he led as president for over 20 years. It was affiliated with Pomona College, where he also was a professor. In 1997 the Institute moved to the Pomona campus.

He is the father of Alex Gibney, an Academy Award-winning documentary film director and producer. Frank Gibney is interviewed in Alex's controversial film about American forces in Afghanistan, Taxi to the Dark Side, released in 2007. Another son, James, was an editor at The New York Times.

At the age of 81, on April 9, 2006, Frank Gibney died of congestive heart failure in Santa Barbara, California. He was survived by his third wife of 34 years, Hiroko Doi, and seven children.

Publications

Books on East Asia
Gibney wrote more than ten books, and co-wrote several more, about half on East Asia. In his five volumes about Japan there is much discussion of the Japanese economy and business practices, placed in cultural context.

"His debut book, Five Gentlemen of Japan (1953), was among the first to depict humanely the wartime enemy through portraits of a journalist, a naval officer, a steelworker, a farmer and Emperor Hirohito." It "gave many Americans their first real understanding of a country that was widely viewed as dangerous and mysterious." "In profiling a farmer, a former vice admiral in the Imperial Navy, a newspaperman, the foreman of a steel mill and Emperor Hirohito, Gibney offered an intimate glimpse into postwar Japanese society."

Elizabeth Gray Vining was a Quaker schoolteacher and former tutor of then Crown Prince Akihito, Hirohito's son. She praised Gibney for his 1953 Five Gents book and its "keen and careful analysis" in a New York Times book review. "Their portraits are drawn with sympathy and insight; none of them is caricature," she wrote. This was "so distinct from films and other propaganda" produced during the recent, hard-fought war in the Pacific.

Japan: The Fragile Superpower, his 1975 book, described how traditional Japan survived in the way modern commerce is practiced. Gibney "contrasted American and Japanese cultural and business traditions."

His 1982 book Miracle by Design celebrates the Japanese work ethic and overall team spirit in economic endeavors. One critic, however, notes here the commonplace comparisons between Japanese and American businesses, observing that Gibney knows the field and has "earned the right to be unoriginal."

The Pacific Century on the rise of East Asia was published in 1992. Starting in the mid-nineteenth century, it surveys the social and economic history of the region, highlighting Japan. Adapted into a ten-part series of the same name on the Public Broadcasting Service, it received an Emmy Award and featured the author. The Pacific Basin Institute, founded and led by Frank Gibney, was a co-producer of the PBS series.

While at the Encyclopædia Britannica he directed its translation into Chinese, Korean, and Japanese. A Japanese translation of the Encyclopedia appeared in 1975. The 1986 Chinese edition was evidently the "first non-Marxist reference work allowed in China." It was a 6-year effort in 10 volumes. The edition dealt "gingerly" with "sensitive" subjects.

Korea's Quiet Revolution (1992) "draws on his long personal experience in Korea" and provides an analysis of the economic growth and the emerging democracy. A brief survey of Korean history is followed by the Korean War (1950-1953), and the short-lived, democratic April Revolution of 1960 in South Korea (ROK). Ample attention is given to the extraordinary economic growth under the authoritarian rule of Park Chung Hee (1961-1979). Its focus then shifts back to the struggle for democracy, up to ROK President Roh Tae Woo (1988-1993). Two later chapters concern the regime in the north. An Appendix presents three articles by Gibney published in 1950, 1954, and 1977.

Books on Communism
His 1959 book on Poland under Communism, The Frozen Revolution, began when Gibney visited there as a journalist in 1957. He'd come to investigate what was called the "Polish October Revolution" of 1956. It was a half successful transformation of government, being limited by Soviet insistence on a continuance of communist rule. Gibney shows how the result seriously subverted the "imperial Communist system" in central Europe and also in Russia. He discusses the late-1950s in Poland: the Communist Party and Wladyslaw Gomulka, intellectual life, the Catholic Church, and troubles in the planned economy. Also addressed are the former-German lands, the Jews of Poland, and Poland during World War II.

The Secret World, also published in 1959, described the Soviet secret police. Gibney co-authored it with Peter Deriabin who had defected from the Soviet NKVD in 1954. Deriabin subsequently worked for the CIA, and occasionally testified before Congressional committees. Apparently, the book had originated as Deriabin's autobiography, Tainy Mir.

Gibney in his 1961 book The Khrushchev Pattern appraises this Soviet leader's career since Stalin's death in 1952. "Gibney credits Khrushchev  with pulling off a prodigious public relations trick in achieving throughout most of the world a new Madison Avenue-style 'public image' for a country whose very name was anathema before he came to power." Yet his "superficially reasonable tactics" are just a dangerous as Stalin's. An appendix reviews the status of communist parties in the countries of the world.

Gibney contributed substantial commentary to The Penkovskiy Papers (1965). Oleg Penkovskiy was a colonel in the GRU (Soviet military intelligence). The book is based around English translations of classified Russian texts, which had previously been provided to American intelligence by Penkovskiy. It presents an insider's view of Soviet intelligence agencies and their trade craft. Its Russian author and source, after a publicized trial, had been executed by the Soviet government in 1963. This book and another co-written with Deriabin made use of material requested from the CIA.

A review of his works
"The extraordinary thing about Frank is that he wrote a great book in the early 1950s and was still going strong 50 years later. He had a deep perspective that came from studying history and business and politics and was able to communicate it well to the public. I don't know anyone with the same combination of energy, upbeat attitude and humor [that] Frank had," commented Prof. Ezra Vogel of Harvard University, his long time friend.

Bibliography

Author
Five Gentlemen of Japan: The Portrait of a Nation's Character (1953, reprint 2002)
The Frozen Revolution: Poland. A study in Communist decay (1959)
The Operators (1960) [about American white collar crime]
The Khrushchev Pattern. Coexistence and its working through international communism (1961)
Japan: The Fragile Super Power (1975, 3d ed. rev'd 1996)
Miracle By Design. The real reason behind Japan's economic success (1982)
The Pacific Century: America and Asia in a Changing World (1992)
Korea's Quiet Revolution: From Garrison State to Democracy (1992)

Co-Author
Peter Deriabin and Frank Gibney, The Secret World (1959)
Oleg Penkovskiy with Frank Gibney, The Penkovskiy Papers (1965)

Editor
Hiromichi Yahara, Battle for Okinawa (1973; English translation 1995). 
Frank Gibney, editor, Unlocking the Bureaucrat's Kingdom: Deregulating the Japanese Economy (1998).
Katsuichi Honda, The Nanjing massacre: a Japanese journalist confronts Japan's national shame (1999), M.E. Sharpe, 
Frank Gibney and Beth Cary, editors, Senso: The Japanese remember the Pacific War (2006).

Notes

External links
Elaine Woo, "Frank Gibney, 81; American Expert on Japan" , obituary in The Los Angeles Times, April 14, 2006.
Margalit Fox,  "Frank Gibney, 81, Writer and Authority on Asia", obituary in The New York Times, April 14, 2006.
Adam Bernstein, "Frank Gibney, 81; Authored Seminal Books on Japan", obituary in The Washington Post, April 13, 2006; accessed May 21, 2015.
Richard Halloran, "Frank Gibney's league of Japanese gentlemen" in The Japan Times, 2002.
Donald Zagoria, Korea's Quitet Revolution by Frank Gibney in Foreign Affairs, Spring 1993 issue.
Jeanne Vronskaya, "Obituary: Peter Deriabin", in The Independent, 20 August 1992.
Book review, Miracle by Design by Frank Gibney in Kirkus Review, November 10, 1982.
Book review, The Khrushchev Pattern by Frank Gibney in Kirkus Review, February 3, 1961.
Book review, The Frozen Revolution. Poland by Frank Gibney in Kirkus Review, July 1, 1959. 
Henry L. Roberts, Five Gentlemen of Japan by Frank Gibney in Foreign Affarirs, April 1954 issue.
Two Frank Gibney articles at Foreign Affairs.
Pacific Basin Institute at Pomona College.

1924 births
2006 deaths
20th-century American historians
American male non-fiction writers
American male journalists
American military writers
United States Navy personnel of World War II
Writers from Scranton, Pennsylvania
United States Navy officers
Yale University alumni
Journalists from Pennsylvania
Historians from Pennsylvania
Pomona College faculty
20th-century American journalists
American expatriates in Japan
Historians from California
20th-century American male writers
Military personnel from Pennsylvania